Nelson is a village in Lee County, Illinois, United States. The population was 170 at the 2010 census, up from 163 in 2000.

History
A post office called Nelson was first established in 1858. The village was named for Samuel Nelson, a pioneer settler.

Geography

Nelson is located at  (41.796494, -89.604646).

Demographics

As of the census of 2000, there were 163 people, 64 households, and 49 families residing in the village. The racial makeup of the village was 96.32% White, 0.61% African American, 0.61% Native American, and 2.45% from two or more races. Hispanic or Latino of any race were 6.13% of the population.

There were 64 households, out of which 31.3% had children under the age of 18 living with them, 60.9% were married couples living together, 9.4% had a female householder with no husband present, and 21.9% were non-families. 17.2% of all households were made up of individuals, and 14.1% had someone living alone who was 65 years of age or older. The average household size was 2.55 and the average family size was 2.90.

In the village, the age distribution of the population shows 24.5% under the age of 18, 6.7% from 18 to 24, 27.6% from 25 to 44, 22.7% from 45 to 64, and 18.4% who were 65 years of age or older. The median age was 41 years. For every 100 females, there were 111.7 males. For every 100 females age 18 and over, there were 101.6 males.

The median income for a household in the village was $35,833, and the median income for a family was $37,500. Males had a median income of $33,125 versus $21,250 for females. The per capita income for the village was $15,043. About 15.9% of families and 30.0% of the population were below the poverty line, including 60.0% of those under the age of eighteen and 9.1% of those 65 or over.

Notable person

 Lou Bevil, pitcher for the Washington Senators

References

Villages in Lee County, Illinois
Villages in Illinois